Schoemann is a surname. Notable people with the surname include:

Georg Friedrich Schoemann (1793–1879), German classical scholar of Swedish heritage
Gloria Schoemann (1910–2006), Mexican film editor
Jost Schoemann-Finck (born 1982), German rower
Hermann Schoemann (1881–1915), German Naval officer killed in World War I
Matthias Schoemann-Finck (born 1979), German rower
Roy Schoemann (1914–1972), center in the National Football League

See also
German destroyer Z7 Hermann Schoemann, Type 1934A-class destroyer built for Nazi Germany's Kriegsmarine in the mid-1930s
Schoeman